David Paskett (born 1944) is a contemporary British watercolour artist, and president of the Royal Watercolour Society (R.W.S.) in the United Kingdom.

Bibliography
 A Vision of China - The Paintings of David Paskett. Hong Kong: Hutchison, 2005.

External links
Official Website of David Paskett
Paskett's Biography from Royal Watercolour Society (R.W.S)
 Interviewed by Alan Macfarlane 12 August 2017 (video)

English watercolourists
1944 births
Living people
20th-century English painters
English male painters
21st-century English painters
20th-century English male artists
21st-century English male artists